Donald R. Schatz (born August 10, 1977) is an American professional sprint car racing driver who competes full-time in the World of Outlaws, driving the No. 15 Ford for Tony Stewart Racing. Schatz is a ten-time champion in the World of Outlaws with a current total of 306 wins.

Racing career
Schatz is son of Danny Christ Schatz, a sprint car driver in the 1970s, and Diane Korgel. He started his racing career at 11 in go karts, and moved to 358 sprint cars as a 15-year-old at Red River Valley Speedway. Schatz moved to 410 sprints and The World of Outlaws series three seasons later as an 18-year-old.

World of Outlaws
Schatz won the 1997 World of Outlaws Rookie of the Year award, and picked up his first A-feature win in 1998..

Schatz has gone on to win ten championships in 2006–2009, 2012, and 2014–2018. He became only the second driver to win the points championship four years in a row, with the other being Steve Kinser. Since 2006 he has recorded a top two points finish, with three second places to go along with the ten championships.

As of June 19th, 2021, Schatz has 300 WoO wins, third most all-time behind Steve Kinser and Sammy Swindell. 

Prestigious wins include the Knoxville Nationals eleven times, (2006–09, 2011–15, 2017, 2022),the 2006, 2007, 2020 Don Martin Memorial Silver Cup; the Brad Doty Classic in 2013, 2016 and 2018; the 2000, 2004, 2005, 2007, 2012 and 2020 National Open at William's Grove Speedway, and the inaugural World of Outlaws World Finals at the Dirt Track at Charlotte Motor Speedway in 2008. He also holds the record for farthest in the field a winner of the Knoxville Nationals has started, when he won from the 21st starting position in 2013.

In 2008, he moved to Tony Stewart Racing, and continues to drive for that team today.

Australia
Schatz has spent time racing in Australia during his career. He won the Grand Annual Sprintcar Classic at the Premier Speedway in Warrnambool, Victoria in 2002, and was runner up in the 1999/2000 and 2001/02 World Series Sprintcars series.

NASCAR
On June 2, 2021, it was announced that Schatz would make his NASCAR and stock car racing debut in the inaugural Truck Series race at Knoxville Raceway, driving the No. 17 for David Gilliland Racing.

Personal life
He was a 1995 graduate of Minot High School. He currently lives in Fargo, North Dakota. He has a step-daughter, Savanna. Schatz is a licensed pilot and spends a great deal of time working with his parents in their family truck stop businesses in Fargo and Minot. He is an avid outdoorsman who enjoys hunting and snowmobiling.

Motorsports career results

NASCAR
(key) (Bold – Pole position awarded by qualifying time. Italics – Pole position earned by points standings or practice time. * – Most laps led.)

Camping World Truck Series

References

External links
 
 

1977 births
Living people
NASCAR drivers
Sportspeople from Minot, North Dakota
World of Outlaws drivers
Racing drivers from North Dakota
USAC Silver Crown Series drivers